Mortonagrion ceylonicum (Sri Lanka midget) is a species of damselfly in the family Coenagrionidae. it is endemic to Sri Lanka.

See also 
 List of odonates of Sri Lanka

References 
 IUCN Red List
 Query Results
 Animal Diversity Web

Coenagrionidae
Insects described in 1971